The 1938–39 Cypriot Cup was the fifth edition of the Cypriot Cup. A total of 7 clubs entered the competition. It began on 23 April 1939 with the preliminary round and concluded on 16 July 1939 with the final which was held at GSP Stadium. AEL won their 1st Cypriot Cup trophy after beating APOEL 3–1 in the final.

Format 
In the 1938–39 Cypriot Cup, participated all the teams of the Cypriot First Division.

The competition consisted of four knock-out rounds. In all rounds each tie was played as a single leg and was held at the home ground of the one of the two teams, according to the draw results. Each tie winner was qualifying to the next round. If a match was drawn, extra time was following. If extra time was drawn, there was a replay match.

Preliminary round

Quarter-finals

Semi-finals

Final

Sources

Bibliography

See also 
 Cypriot Cup
 1938–39 Cypriot First Division

Cypriot Cup seasons
1938–39 domestic association football cups
1938–39 in Cypriot football